Ulrich Hippauf is a former East German slalom canoeist who competed in the 1960s. He won a gold medal in the C-2 team event at the 1967 ICF Canoe Slalom World Championships in Lipno.

References

German male canoeists
Possibly living people
Year of birth missing (living people)
Medalists at the ICF Canoe Slalom World Championships